Związek Młodzieży Polskiej (Union or Association of Polish Youth, abbr. ZMP) was a Polish communist youth organization, existing from 1948 to 1956. It was subordinated to Polish United Workers' Party

It was formed from the Union of Youth Struggle (Związek Walki Młodych) and several other organizations.

For several years it supervised Polish scouting. Membership in it was often obligatory (officially or unofficially) for various purposes, such as being able to attend the universities. Membership was refused to those who were deemed "unsuitable" - due to non-worker/peasant family background, or their ties with the pro-West World War II-era Polish forces or resistance.

Its membership grew from almost 0.5 million in 1948, to over 1 million in 1951 and over 2 million in 1955.

The uniform of a ZMP member consisted of a green shirt and red tie.

At the moment traditions and heritage of Union of Polish Youth is preserved in Poland by Progressive Youth of Poland.

See also
Bolesław Bierut
Union of Youth Struggle

References
   Związek Walki Młodych – Związek Młodzieży Polskiej on the pages of the Polish Institute of National Remembrance

External links
Progressive Youth of Poland

1948 establishments in Poland
Youth organizations established in 1948
Organizations disestablished in 1956
Polish People's Republic
Youth organisations based in Poland
Stalinism in Poland
Youth wings of communist parties
Youth wings of political parties in Poland
Polish United Workers' Party
Socialist organisations in Poland